The Corps of Colonial Marines were two different British Marine units raised from former black slaves for service in the Americas, at the behest of Alexander Cochrane. The units were created at two separate periods: 1808-1810 during the Napoleonic Wars; and then again during the War of 1812; both units being disbanded once the military threat had passed. Apart from being created in each case by Cochrane, they had no connection with each other.

The first Corps was a small unit that served in the Caribbean from 1808 to 12 October 1810, recruited from former slaves to address the shortage of military manpower in the Caribbean. The locally-recruited men were less susceptible to tropical illnesses than were troops sent from Britain. The Corps followed the practice of the British Army's West India Regiments in recruiting former slaves as soldiers. In the previous year, the Mutiny Act of 1807 emancipated all slaves in the British Army and, as a result, subsequently enlisted slaves were considered free on enlistment.

The second, more substantial, Corps served from 18 May 1814 until 20 August 1816. The greater part of the Corps was stationed at St. Augustine on the Atlantic coast, with a smaller body occupying the future Negro Fort, on the Apalachicola River in remote northwest Florida. Recruits were accepted from among escaped slaves who had already gained their freedom on coming into British hands and who were unwilling to join West India Regiments. The establishment of the force sparked controversy at the time, as the arming of former slaves was a psychological as well as military threat to the slave-owning society of the United States. As a consequence, the two senior officers of the Corps in Florida, George Woodbine and Edward Nicolls, were demonised by Americans such as Hezekiah Niles in his Baltimore publication, the Weekly Register for their association with the Corps and inducing slave revolt.

At the end of the War of 1812, as the British post in Florida was evacuated, the Corps' Florida detachment was paid off and disbanded. Although several men accompanied the British to Bermuda, the majority continued to live in settlements around the fort the Corps had garrisoned. This legacy of a community of armed fugitive slaves with a substantial arsenal was unacceptable to the United States of America. After the Fort was destroyed in the Battle of Negro Fort of 1816, the former Marines joined the southward migration of Seminoles and African Americans escaping the American advance. Members of the Colonial Marine battalion who were deployed on the Atlantic coast withdrew from American territory. They continued in British service as garrison-in-residence at Bermuda until 1816, when the unit was disbanded and the ex-Marines resettled on Trinidad.

First Corps
Rear Admiral Sir Alexander Cochrane raised the first Corps of Colonial Marines in 1808 while commander-in-chief of British naval forces on the Leeward Islands station during the Napoleonic Wars. The British had captured the island of Marie Galante earlier that year, but the French governor of Guadeloupe attacked the island on hearing that illness had weakened its British garrison. Marie Galante slaves assisted the British when promised that they would not be returned to their proprietors; by this means, the island was preserved under British control until the arrival of three companies of the 1st West India Regiment.

Cochrane named the ex-slaves the Corps of Colonial Marines, which was enlarged with fugitive slaves from Guadeloupe. The Corps was paid from Marie Galante revenues, clothed from Royal Navy stores and commanded by Royal Marine officers. After the repossession of Guadeloupe Cochrane maintained the Corps, and on 12 October 1810 redistributed the men: 70 among the ships of the squadron, 20 to 30 to the battery at the Saintes (a group of small islands south of Guadeloupe) and 50 remaining in the Marie Galante garrison. They saw no further action as a distinct body, but were listed in ships' musters among supernumeraries for wages and victuals under the description "Colonial Marine" until mid-1815.

Second Corps
Cochrane, by now a Vice Admiral, assumed his position as Commander-in-Chief of British forces on the North Atlantic station in April 1814 and ordered the recruitment of a body of Colonial Marines as he had done six years earlier on Marie Galante. Rear Admiral George Cockburn, Cochrane's second-in-command on the Atlantic coast, implemented Cochrane's order recruiting the second Corps of Colonial Marines. It served as part of the British forces on the Atlantic and Gulf coasts of the United States during the War of 1812.

On 2 April 1814, Cochrane issued a proclamation to all persons wishing to emigrate. Any persons would be received by the British, either at a military outpost or aboard British ships; those seeking sanctuary could enter His Majesty's forces, or go "as free settlers to the British possessions in North America or the West Indies". An historical precedent was Dunmore's Proclamation of 7 November 1775, although this offered freedom only to those who bore arms with British forces.

Recruitment and Atlantic coast service
By 10 May, Tangier Island off the Virginia coast had been occupied by the British and offered an accessible location for those seeking refuge. Male refugees were given the option "to become blue Jackets, take up arms or [to] join the working party" constructing Fort Albion and its infrastructure. The Corps was embodied on 18 May 1814 and made its combat debut in the raid on Pungoteague Creek on 30 May 1814 where, in a skirmish known as the Battle of Rumley's Gut, it helped capture an American artillery battery. Their conduct was marked by great spirit and vivacity, and perfect obedience". One, a soldier named Michael Harding, was killed early in the battle but "it did not daunt or check the others, but on the contrary animated them to seek revenge". Cockburn's initial impressions were positive; he observed that the new recruits were "getting on astonishingly" and were "really fine fellows". After this, the Corps participated in the Chesapeake campaign; in subsequent correspondence, Cockburn wrote that the recruits had behaved "unexpectedly well" in several engagements and had not committed any "improper outrages".

Members of the Corps served alongside their shipborne Royal Marine counterparts from the Cockburn Chesapeake squadron (HM Ships Albion, Dragon, Loire, Jasseur and the schooner ), participating in a series of raids. After the British failed to destroy the American Chesapeake Bay Flotilla at the Battle of St. Jerome Creek, they conducted coastal raids on the towns of Calverton, Huntingtown, Prince Frederick, Benedict and Lower Marlborough. On 15 June 1814, a force of 30 Colonial Marines accompanied 180 Royal Marines in 12 boats in a raid on Benedict. Nine days later, on 24 June, a force of Colonial and 180 Royal Marines attacked an artillery battery at Chesconessex Creek (although this failed to prevent the escape of the Chesapeake Bay Flotilla, which left St. Leonard's Creek two days later).

The arrival on 19 July of a battalion of Royal Marines, which had left Bermuda on 30 June, enabled the squadron to mount further expeditions ashore. After a series of diversionary raids, the Marines were again landed at Benedict on 19 August accompanied by recently-arrived Peninsular War army veterans. The battalion was to accompany the Colonial Marines in attacks on Bladensburg and Washington in August 1814. A company fought at the Battle of Bladensburg, and the other two companies took part in the burning of Washington. One of the firing parties was led by Second Lieutenant Lewis Agassiz (1793–1866); for his part in the battle, his family was later granted a coat of arms depicting a torch. Casualties suffered by the Colonial Marines during this action were one man killed and three wounded.

On 3 September 1814, three companies of the Colonial Marines joined with three remaining companies of Royal Marines to form the 3rd Battalion, Royal and Colonial Marines. Later that month, all three companies fought at the Battle of North Point in Maryland. A fourth company was created in December 1814, and further recruitment was begun along the Georgia coast during the first quarter of 1815. The number of enlistments allowed two more companies to be raised, with sergeants taken from companies recruited in the Chesapeake.

Although the Corps suffered some combat losses during its Chesapeake campaign actions in 1814, its greatest losses arose from disease due to poor conditions on Tangier Island. An outbreak of dysentery in the winter of 1814 killed the surgeon and 69 men from the battalion. 
The strength of the corps is mentioned as having risen to about 200 men whilst on Tangier Island in the autumn. The Corps' last tour during the War of 1812 was in Georgia from December to March 1815. Admiral George Cockburn seized the southern U.S coast to disrupt trade, communication, and transportation of troops to the Gulf of Mexico, where Admiral Cochrane's forces planned to take the southwestern territories of the U.S. Part of the Corps joined the successful British attack on Fort Point Peter. The corps occupied Camden County and Cumberland Island, aiding the emigration of an estimated 1,485 slaves from southeast Georgia.

Recruitment and Gulf coast service
In addition to British outposts on the Atlantic coast at Tangier Island (Virginia) and Cumberland Island (Georgia), there was a similar outpost on the Gulf coast at Prospect Bluff on the Apalachicola River in Spanish East Florida which attracted Redstick Creek Indians and Black Seminoles. George Woodbine and a detachment of Royal Marines were landed from HMS Orpheus in May 1814 with gifts, two thousand muskets and blankets for the Indians. A fort was constructed, and Cochrane sent Edward Nicolls to oversee the operations at Prospect Bluff.

Nicolls left Bermuda with 112 Royal Marines, 3 field pieces, 300 uniforms and 1,000 muskets for recruits to his corps. On 26 August 1814 Nicolls issued his first "order of the day" for his "battalion". It remains uncertain how many men Nicolls had under his command at that time, since muster and pay records have not been found. More escaped slaves were recruited in Pensacola (to the chagrin of the Spanish), but they were forced to return to Prospect Bluff in November after the American capture of Pensacola.

Post-war developments
The war ended in February 1815, and the three European companies of the 3rd Battalion, Royal and Colonial Marines were sent back to Britain. With their departure, the battalion was reformed as the 3rd Battalion, Colonial Marines, consisting of six infantry companies of Colonial Marines and a staff company of Royal Marines brought from Canada. They performed garrison duty at the Royal Naval Dockyard at Ireland Island, Bermuda and were carried from there in the transport Lord Eldon to be disbanded in Trinidad on 20 August 1816. Near what is now known as Princes Town, the former Colonial Marines formed a free farming community, known as the Merikens (sometimes spelled Merikins), under the supervision of their former non-commissioned officers. Households had  plots. These settlements were successful, and in 1847 their ownership of the land was formally recognised. The community of descendants retains its identity and commemorates its roots in an annual celebration.

The detachment in Florida, which had grown to about 400 men, was paid off and disbanded when the British post was evacuated at the end of the war. A small number of men went to Bermuda with the British as part of a refugee group, rejoining the main body of Colonial Marines. Others from the Florida unit remained in settlements around the Fort which had become a symbol of slave insurrection. Southern plantation owners considered the presence of a group of armed fugitive slaves, even in a remote and sparsely-populated area of Spanish Florida, an unacceptable danger; this led, under the leadership of General Andrew Jackson, to the Battle of Negro Fort in July 1816 and the beginning of the First Seminole War. For their involvement in the conflict, two former auxiliary officers of the corps were executed in 1818 in what became known as the Arbuthnot and Ambrister incident. It is believed that former Colonial Marine refugees were among a group that escaped to the Bahamas in 1822 and founded, on the west coast of the island of Andros, Nicholls Town , a community that retains its identity to the present day.

See also
 Merikins
 West India Regiment

Notes

References

 Agassiz, Arthur Rodolph Nunn (1907). A Short History of the Agassiz Family. Shanghai: Oriental Press. 
 Buckley, Roger Norman (1998). The British Army in the West Indies: Society and the Military in the Revolutionary Age. Gainesville, Florida, University Press of Florida. , .
 Bullard, Mary R. Black Liberation on Cumberland Island in 1815. M.R. Bullard, 1983. 141p. 
 Congress of the USA (1834). American State Papers: Foreign Relations: Volume 4, Commencing March 5, 1815 and Ending May 8, 1822. Washington: Gales & Seaton. 
 
 Ellis, A. B. (1885). The History of the First West India Regiment. London: Chapman & Hall. 
 Foreign Office (1835). British and Foreign State Papers Volume 6, 1818–1819. Piccadilly, London: James Ridgway. 
 Gleig, George Robert (1827). The Campaigns of the British Army at Washington and New Orleans, 1814–1815. London: John Murray. 
 Heidler, David Stephen & Jeanne T. (2004). Encyclopedia of the War of 1812. Annapolis, Maryland: Naval Institute Press. 
 Lambert, Andrew (2012). The Challenge: Britain Against America in the Naval War of 1812. London: Faber and Faber. 
 Landers, Jane G. (2010). Atlantic Creoles in the Age of Revolutions. Cambridge, Massachusetts: Harvard University Press. 
 Latimer, Jon (2007). 1812: War With America. Cambridge, Massachusetts: Harvard University Press. 
 Latour, Arsène Lacarrière (1816). Historical Memoir of the War in West Florida and Louisiana in 1814–15. Philadelphia: John Conrad & Co. 
 Mahon, John K. (ed). (1991). The War of 1812. Cambridge, Massachusetts: Da Capo Press. .
 Marshall, John (1825). Royal Naval Biography. London: Longman, Hurst, Rees, Orme, and Brown. 
 Morriss, Roger (1997). Cockburn and the British Navy in Transition: Admiral Sir George Cockburn, 1772–1853. Columbia, South Carolina: University of South Carolina Press. 
 Nicolas, Paul Harris (1845). Historical Record of the Royal Marine Forces, Volume 2 [1805–1842]. London: Thomas & William Boone. 
 Owsley, Frank L. & Smith, Gene A. (1997). Filibusters and Expansionists: Jeffersonian Manifest Destiny, 1800–1821. Tuscaloosa, Alabama: University of Alabama Press. 
 Rodriguez, Junius P. (ed). (2007). Encyclopedia of Slave Resistance and Rebellion, Volume 1. Westport, Connecticut: Greenwood Publishing Group. 
 
 Sutherland, Jonathan. (2004). African Americans at War: An Encyclopedia. Santa Barbara, California: ABC-CLIO. 
 Tucker, Spencer (ed). (2012). The Encyclopedia of the War of 1812: A Political, Social, and Military History. Santa Barbara, California: ABC-CLIO. 
 Weiss, John McNish (2002). The Merikens: Free Black American Settlers in Trinidad 1815–16. London: McNish & Weiss. 
 Weiss, John McNish. (1996). "The Corps of Colonial Marines 1814–16: A Summary". Immigrants and Minorities, 15/1, April 1996.  Note: this early article is amended by the book 'The Merikens' and by the author's web article  .
 Whitfield, Harvey Amani (2006). Blacks on the Border: The Black Refugees in British North America, 1815–1860. Lebanon, New Hampshire: University Press of New Hampshire.

External links
 A History of the Colonial Marines
 Essay and video on Colonial Marines
 Biography of William Peterson, a Private in the Corps of Colonial Marines via Flee! Stories of Flight from Maryland In Black and White and its 1812 link
 Corps of Colonial Marines pay & muster list in 1814
 Marine casualties of the War of 1812

Military units and formations established in 1808
Military units and formations of the British Empire
British military units and formations of the War of 1812
Royal Marine formations and units
Slave soldiers
Disbanded marine forces
African-American diaspora
African-American history of the United States military
American rebel slaves
Slavery in North America
Slavery in the United States
Negro Fort
Fugitive American slaves